The Polish Cup in football is an elimination tournament for Polish football clubs, held continuously from 1950, and is the second most important national title in Polish football after the Ekstraklasa title. Due to mass participation of teams, the tournament is often called The Cup of the Thousand Teams.

Participation is open to any club registered with the Polish FA, regardless of whether it competes in any league in the national pyramid. Reserve and veteran teams are also eligible, with reserve teams reaching the final on two occasions (and winning it once). The Cup is popular among lower-level teams, as it gives them a chance to play better known sides. In some cases, the underdogs even reached the final, with the most famous example being Czarni Żagań, which in 1964–1965 season lost the final game 0–4 to Górnik Zabrze.

Lower league clubs have to enter regional qualification rounds and the winners of these join the teams from the first and second division in the competition proper. The regional qualifications are played in the preceding season, so that one edition of Polish Cup for lower ranked clubs can last two seasons. Each tie is decided by a single game which is held at the lower league side's stadium. The final used to be a single match, but 2002–2006 it was contested over two legs. Since 2007, the Cup has returned to the single-game final.

The first edition of the Polish Cup took place in 1926, but it was quickly abandoned. In the late 1930s, the President of Poland's Football Cup was organized, which featured teams of the Polish Football Association's regional districts.

Polish Cup winners
Previous cup winners are: 

 1926: Wisła Kraków
 1927–50: not played
 1951: Ruch Chorzów
 1952: Polonia Warsaw
 1953: not played
 1954: Gwardia Warsaw
 1955: Legia Warsaw
 1956: Legia Warsaw
 1957: ŁKS Łódź
 1958–61: not played
 1962: Zagłębie Sosnowiec
 1963: Zagłębie Sosnowiec
 1964: Legia Warsaw
 1965: Górnik Zabrze
 1966: Legia Warsaw
 1967: Wisła Kraków
 1968: Górnik Zabrze
 1969: Górnik Zabrze
 1970: Górnik Zabrze
 1971: Górnik Zabrze
 1972: Górnik Zabrze
 1973: Legia Warsaw
 1974: Ruch Chorzów
 1975: Stal Rzeszów
 1976: Śląsk Wrocław
 1977: Zagłębie Sosnowiec
 1978: Zagłębie Sosnowiec
 1979: Arka Gdynia
 1980: Legia Warsaw
 1981: Legia Warsaw
 1982: Lech Poznań
 1983: Lechia Gdańsk
 1984: Lech Poznań
 1985: Widzew Łódź
 1986: GKS Katowice
 1987: Śląsk Wrocław
 1988: Lech Poznań
 1989: Legia Warsaw
 1990: Legia Warsaw
 1991: GKS Katowice
 1992: Miedź Legnica
 1993: GKS Katowice
 1994: Legia Warsaw
 1995: Legia Warsaw
 1996: Ruch Chorzów
 1997: Legia Warsaw
 1998: Amica Wronki
 1999: Amica Wronki
 2000: Amica Wronki
 2001: Polonia Warsaw
 2002: Wisła Kraków
 2003: Wisła Kraków
 2004: Lech Poznań
 2005: not awarded
 2006: Wisła Płock
 2007: Dyskobolia Grodzisk Wlkp.
 2008: Legia Warsaw
 2009: Lech Poznań
 2010: Jagiellonia Białystok
 2011: Legia Warsaw
 2012: Legia Warsaw
 2013: Legia Warsaw
 2014: Zawisza Bydgoszcz
 2015: Legia Warsaw
 2016: Legia Warsaw
 2017: Arka Gdynia
 2018: Legia Warsaw
 2019: Lechia Gdańsk
 2020: Cracovia
 2021: Raków Częstochowa
 2022: Raków Częstochowa

Performances

Performance by club

See also
 Football in Poland
 Polish Championship in Football
 Polish SuperCup

References

External links
Official website 
Polish Cup at uefa.com 

 
1
National association football cups